Folker Bohnet (7 August 19376 October 2020) was a German actor, theatre director and playwright. He played in the 1959 film Die Brücke directed by Bernhard Wicki while still a student in Berlin. Later, he focused on comedy for the stage, as actor, director and author of plays, touring internationally. He was a regular director and actor at the Ohnsorg-Theater in Hamburg.

Life and career 
Born as Folker Bohnet-Waldraff in Berlin, he moved with his family to Düsseldorf where he completed school with the Abitur.

While still a student, he took part in three films in quick succession, including the world success Die Brücke (The Bridge) directed by Bernhard Wicki in 1959. He played Hans Scholten, the most level-headed of seven boys who are to defend a bridge at the end of the Second World War. His other films include  (1960), Schloß Hubertus (1973) and Visconti's drama Ludwig (1973), in which he played the actor Josef Kainz who was adored by Ludwig II of Bavaria. Bohnet also appeared in numerous television productions until the 1990s, but he spent most of his career on the theatre stage.

His success with Die Brücke was followed by permanent engagements and guest performances at theatres such as Thalia-Theater, Ernst Deutsch Theater and the Hamburger Kammerspiele, all in Hamburg, Renaissance Theater and Volksbühne in Berlin, Schauspiel Frankfurt, Residenz Theatre in Munich, Theater in der Josefstadt in Vienna, and Bühnen der Stadt Köln. He played at festivals such as Bad Hersfelder Festspiele and in touring productions. In addition to his work as an actor, Bohnet regularly directed theatre productions. From 1977, Bohnet authored numerous comedies, which were performed throughout the German-speaking world and beyond. He toured with his In anderen Umständen (In Other Circumstances) for 13 years.

Bohnet's first direction job of 17 at the Hamburg Ohnsorg-Theater was Lustfahrt ins Paradies in 2002, his last Dinner für Spinner. It was his trademark to stage a scene after the last curtain fall. He was regarded as a master of timing in comedies, and able to present classical plays from a different angle, such as Kleist's Der zerbrochne Krug in low German as Dat Schörengericht. He was still working as a stage actor and director at the age of 80, for example playing Mephisto at Kleines Theater im Park in Bad Godesberg in 2019.

Bohnet was married to the actress , and the couple had a son, the physicist and writer . Bohnet has another son, the actor Markus Lorenz-Bohnet. In 2001, he entered into a registered partnership with Alexander Alexy, dentist and partner in many of his plays, with whom he had been associated since the 1980s.

Bohnet died during the night from 5 to 6 October 2020 at his home at the age of 83 of lung cancer.

Filmography 

Bohnet played in the following films:
 1958: 
 1959: Die Brücke
 1960: 
 1960: Das Haus voller Gäste
 1960: Der Geizige (television film)
 1965: Winter in Ischia
 1965: Im Schlaraffenland
 1967:  (television series, seven episodes)
 1967: Der Zauberberg
 1968: Nationalkomitee "Freies Deutschland"
 1968: Der Kaufmann von Venedig (television film)
 1970: Beiß mich, Liebling
 1970: Friedrich III. ...gestorben als Kaiser (television film)
 1971: Der Babutz
 1972: Ludwig
 1973: Schloß Hubertus
 1977: Kaspar Laris Abenteuer, (director: Armin Maiwald), ARD series
 1981: Die Laurents, (director: E. Neureuther), ARD series
 1992: Salzburger Nockerln, RTL series
 1992: Freunde fürs Leben, ZDF series (one episode)
 1995: Serienstars einmal anders – der Landarzt lässt die Sau raus (ZDF documentary of the tour of In anderen Umständen with Bohnet,  (director),  et al.)
 1995: Die Partner, RTL series
 1997: Parkhotel Stern, Sat1 series

Plays directed by Bohnet 
 1963: Les Caprices de Marianne (drama)
 1981: Gyges und sein Ring (drama)
 1986: Kuckucksei
 2001: Lustfahrt ins Paradies (Ohnsorg-Theater)
 2005: Pension Schöller (Ohnsorg-Theater)
 2006: The Queen of Quäkenbüttel (Ohnsorg-Theater)
 2006: Alles auf Anfang (Ohnsorg-Theater)
 2008: Dree Mann an ne Küst (Ohnsorg-Theater)
 2009: Geld verdirbt den Charakter (Ohnsorg-Theater)
 2010: Alles auf Krankenschein (Ohnsorg-Theater)
 2013: Lügen haben junge Beine (Ohnsorg-Theater)
 2013: De spaansche Fleeg (Ohnsorg-Theater)
 2017: Die Katze lässt das Mausen nicht (Ohnsorg-Theater)

Plays written by Bohnet 
 1977: Meine Mutter tut das nicht! (with 
 1982: Die Hausdame (with Hans-Jürgen Schatz, actor and director)
 1993: Erbe verpflichtet (with J. Schatz)
 1996: Unsere Mutter wird 'ne Diva
 1996: In anderen Umständen: eine Klamödie (with Alexander Alexy)
 1997: Jeder nach seiner Fasson (with A. Alexy)
 2001: Alles Böse zum Geburtstag (with A. Alexy)
 2008: Liebeslänglich (with A. Alexy)
 2013: Der Froschkönig (fairy tale play based on the Brothers Grimm, with Mathias Fischedick)
 2017: Tango unterm Regenbogen (with A. Alexy)
 2020: Oscar dla Emily (Ein Oskar für Emily, An Oscar for Emily), Teatr Telewizji Warsaw)

References

External links 
 
 
 
 : Der verzauberte Junge von der Brücke, iljabohnet.wordpress.com

German male film actors
German theatre directors
German television directors
German dramatists and playwrights
1937 births
2020 deaths
Male actors from Berlin